S62 is a star in the cluster surrounding Sagittarius A* (Sgr A*), the supermassive black hole in the center of the Milky Way. S62 orbits Sgr A* faster than any other star known as at August 2019. With an orbital period of only 9.9 years, it beats by a substantial margin the previous record holder, the star S55, which circles Sgr A* in 12.8 years.

In addition, S62 has a highly eccentric orbit which makes it pass very close to Sgr A*, only , less than the distance between Uranus and the Sun. The star therefore passes only about 215 times the Schwarzschild radius of Sgr A* (the Schwarzschild radius of Sgr A* is approximately 0.082 AU, or 12 million km). It is closer to Sgr A* than the previous record, around 45 AU (6.7 billion km, 550 Schwarzschild radii) held by the star S175, and much closer than the better-studied S2 (118 AU, 18 billion km, 1,440 Schwarzschild radii).

S62 passes so close to Sgr A* that its orbit has a very large precession: its orbit shifts by about 10° with each revolution. At closest approach its velocity is about 0.10c (10% of the speed of light) relative to Sgr A*. S62's next approach to Sgr A* is towards the end of 2022.

The discovery of S62 improved the bounds on the mass distribution in the center of the galactic center, showing that   are concentrated within 16 AU of the center, fully consistent with Sgr A* being a supermassive black hole.

References

Sagittarius (constellation)